Valva (Greek: , Ptol. iv. 2. § 16) was an ancient mountain located in the province of Mauretania Caesariensis, in present-day Algeria.

References

Mauretania Caesariensis
Mountains of Algeria